XG (acronym for Xtraordinary Girls) is a Japanese girl group based in South Korea. The group was formed by Xgalx, a subsidiary of Avex, and is composed of seven members: Jurin, Chisa, Hinata, Juria, Cocona, Maya, and Harvey. They made their debut on March 18, 2022, with the release of the digital single "Tippy Toes".

Name
The group's name XG is an acronym of "Xtraordinary Girls". The term is used as an aspirational name the group strives to empower young people all over the world with their fresh, inventive music and performance.

Career

2022–present: Introduction and debut

XG's social media accounts were launched on January 25, 2022, with a short video entitled Xgalx – The Beginning. The video showed several girls in training for the Xgalx Project. This was followed by a dance performance video directed by Choi Hyo-jin, of the Korean street dance TV show Street Woman Fighter. Over the next few weeks the group released a series of teaser content, including rap video featuring Jurin and Harvey performing a cover of Rob Stone's "Chill Bill", and a vocal cover video of Justin Bieber's "Peaches", performed by Juria and Chisa. On February 2, XG posted solo dance performance videos, with each member dancing in a different style.

On March 18, XG made their debut with the release of their all English-language digital single "Tippy Toes". On June 29, they released their second all English-language single titled "Mascara", followed by their first television appearance on South Korean Mnet's M Countdown performing the single.

On November 17, XG released a rap cypher video entitled Galz Xypher. The video became viral on a TikTok through an XG fan account, gaining 14 million views on the platform.

On January 25, 2023, XG released their third all English-language single, "Shooting Star" along with its music video and an additional track, "Left Right".

On March 6 2023, XG entered the Mediabase US Radio Top 40, becoming the first female Japanese artists and the first Japanese group to do so.

Members
 Chisa
 Hinata
 Jurin – leader
 Harvey
 Juria
 Maya
 Cocona

Discography

Singles

Videography

Music videos

Awards and nominations

References

External links

 

J-pop music groups
Musical groups established in 2022
Japanese girl groups
Japanese hip hop groups
Japanese dance music groups
Avex Group artists
English-language musical groups from Japan
2022 establishments in South Korea